23S rRNA (uridine2479-2'-O)-methyltransferase (AviRb) is an enzyme with systematic name S-adenosyl-L-methionine:23S rRNA (uridine2479-2'-O)-methyltransferase. This enzyme catalyses the following chemical reaction

 S-adenosyl-L-methionine + uridine2479 in 23S rRNA  S-adenosyl-L-homocysteine + 2'-O-methyluridine2479 in 23S rRNA

Streptomyces viridochromogenes produces the antibiotic avilamycin A which binds to the 50S ribosomal subunit to inhibit protein synthesis.

References

External links 
 

EC 2.1.1